On 30 November 2022, a suicide bombing of a police truck in Quetta, Balochistan, Pakistan, killed three people and injured 27 others, including 23 corps. The police were travelling to protect polio vaccinators.

See also
 Quetta attack

References

2022 in Balochistan, Pakistan
2022 murders in Pakistan
2020s crimes in Quetta
November 2022 events in Pakistan
Terrorist incidents in Pakistan in 2022